The men's 10 metre platform was one of five diving events on the diving at the 1920 Summer Olympics programme. The competition was held on Sunday, 28 August 1920 (first round) and on Monday, 29 August 1920 (final).

Sources vary on whether Adolfo Wellisch competed, and thus whether 14 or 15 divers from 6 or 7 nations competed. The official report does not list him, but both de Wael and sports-reference include him, with the latter even giving a score.

Results

First round

Sunday, 28 August 1920: The three divers who scored the smallest number of points in each group of the first round advanced to the final.

Group 1

Group 2

Final
Monday, 29 August 1920:

References

Sources
 
 

Men
1920
Men's events at the 1920 Summer Olympics